Iron(II) selenide refers to a number of inorganic compounds of ferrous iron and selenide (Se2−). The phase diagram of the system Fe–Se reveals the existence of several non-stoichiometric phases between ~49 at. % Se and ~53 at. % Fe, and temperatures up to ~450 °C. The low temperature stable phases are the tetragonal PbO-structure (P4/nmm) β-Fe1−xSe and α-Fe7Se8. The high temperature phase is the hexagonal, NiAs structure (P63/mmc) δ-Fe1−xSe. Iron(II) selenide occurs naturally as the NiAs-structure mineral achavalite.

More selenium rich iron selenide phases are the γ phases (γ and γˈ), assigned the Fe3Se4 stoichiometry, and FeSe2, which occurs as the marcasite-structure natural mineral ferroselite, or the rare pyrite-structure mineral dzharkenite.

It is used in electrical semiconductors.

Superconductivity
β-FeSe is the simplest iron-based superconductor but with diverse properties. It starts to superconduct at 8 K at normal pressure but its critical temperature (Tc) is dramatically increased to 38 K under pressure, by means of intercalation, or after quenching at high pressures. The combination of both intercalation and pressure results in re-emerging superconductivity at 48 K.

In 2013 it was reported that a single atomic layer of FeSe epitaxially grown on SrTiO3 is superconductive with a then-record transition temperature for iron-based superconductors of 70 K. This discovery has attracted significant attention and in 2014 a superconducting transition temperature of over 100K was reported for this system.

References

Iron(II) compounds
Selenides
Semiconductor materials
Nickel arsenide structure type
Superconductors